The "Dear Boss" letter was a message allegedly written by the notorious unidentified Victorian serial killer known as Jack the Ripper. Addressed to the Central News Agency of London and dated 25 September 1888, the letter was postmarked and received by the Central News Agency on 27 September. The letter itself was forwarded to Scotland Yard on 29 September.

Although many dispute its authenticity, the "Dear Boss" letter is regarded as the first piece of correspondence signed by one Jack the Ripper, ultimately resulting in the unidentified killer being known by this name.

Content
The "Dear Boss" letter was written in red ink, was two pages long and contains several spelling and punctuation errors. The overall motivation of the author was evidently to mock investigative efforts and to allude to future murders. The letter itself reads:

Media publication
Initially, the letter was considered to be just one of many hoax letters purporting to be from the murderer. However, following the discovery of the body of Catherine Eddowes in Mitre Square on 30 September, investigators noted a section of the auricle and earlobe of her right ear had been severed, giving credence to the author's promise within the letter to "clip the lady's ears off". In response, the Metropolitan Police published numerous handbills containing duplicates of both this letter and the "Saucy Jacky" postcard in the hope that a member of the public would recognise the handwriting of the author. Numerous local and national newspapers also reprinted the text of the "Dear Boss" letter in whole or in part. These efforts failed to generate any significant leads.

Perpetrator pseudonym
Following the publication of the "Dear Boss" letter and the "Saucy Jacky" postcard, both forms of correspondence gained worldwide notoriety. These publications were the first occasion in which the name "Jack the Ripper" had been used to refer to the killer. The term captured the imagination of the public. In the weeks following their publication, hundreds of hoax letters claiming to be from "Jack the Ripper" were received by police and press alike, most of which copied key phrases from these letters.

Authenticity
In the years following the Ripper murders, police officials have stated that they believed both the "Dear Boss" letter and the "Saucy Jacky" postcard were elaborate hoaxes most likely penned by a local journalist. Initially, these suspicions received little publicity, with the public believing the press articles that the unknown murderer had sent numerous messages taunting the police and threatening further murders. This correspondence became one of the enduring legends of the Ripper case. However, the opinions of modern scholars are divided upon which, if any, of the letters should be considered genuine. The "Dear Boss" letter is one of three named most frequently as potentially having been written by the killer, and a number of authors have tried to advance their theories as to the Ripper's identity by comparing handwriting samples of suspects to the writing within the "Dear Boss" letter.

Like many documents related to the Ripper case, the "Dear Boss" letter disappeared from the police files shortly after the investigation into the murders had ended. The letter may have been kept as a souvenir by one of the investigating officers. In November 1987, the letter was returned anonymously to the Metropolitan Police, whereupon Scotland Yard recalled all documents relating to the Whitechapel Murders from the Public Record Office, now The National Archives, at Kew.

Journalist's confession
In 1931, a journalist named Fred Best is reported to have confessed that he and a colleague at The Star newspaper named Tom Bullen had written the "Dear Boss" letter, the "Saucy Jacky" postcard, and other hoax messages purporting to be from the Whitechapel Murderer—whom they together had chosen to name Jack the Ripper—in order to maintain acute public interest in the case and generally maintain high sales of their publication.

Calligraphy and linguistic analysis
The handwriting of the letter "Dear Boss" was compared to that of the supposed diary of  James Maybrick in 1993. The report noted that the "characteristics of the Dear Boss letter follow closely upon the round hand writing style of the time and exhibit a good writing skill."

In 2018, a forensic linguist based at the University of Manchester named Andrea Nini stated his conviction that both the "Dear Boss" letter and the "Saucy Jacky" postcard had been written by the same individual. Commenting upon his conclusions, Dr Nini stated: "My conclusion is that there is very strong linguistic evidence that these two [pieces of correspondence] were written by the same person. People in the past had already expressed this tentative conclusion, on the basis of similarity of handwriting, but this had not been established with certainty."

Notes

References

Cited works and further reading

External links

 The "Dear Boss" letter at casebook.org
 Jack the Ripper letters: "Dear Boss" at whitechapeljack.com
 "Dear Boss" letter: How Jack the Ripper got his name at britishnewspaperarchive.co.uk

1888 documents
Hoaxes in England
Jack the Ripper
Letters (message)
Murder in London